Love Is Better Than Ever is a 1952 American romantic comedy film directed by Stanley Donen from a screenplay by Ruth Brooks Flippen, starring Larry Parks and Elizabeth Taylor. The plot concerns a small-town girl who falls in love with a big-city talent agent.

Plot
Confirmed bachelor Jud Parker (Larry Parks) likes his life the way it is. A talent agent, he goes to New Haven, Connecticut on a client's behalf and meets Anastacia "Stacie" Macaboy (Elizabeth Taylor), who owns a dance school.

Stacie then runs into him in New York when she goes to a convention. Jud takes her to a New York Giants baseball game and to dinner and dancing. Stacie falls in love, but Jud is furious when a story in the New Haven paper claims they are engaged.

Mrs. Levoy and her daughter, who run a rival dance school, sully Stacie's reputation and cause students to drop out. Stacie and Jud disagree on how to explain their relationship until Stacie ultimately bets everything on the outcome of the Giants' next game.

Cast
 Larry Parks as Jud Parker
 Elizabeth Taylor as Anastacia (Stacie) Macaboy
 Josephine Hutchinson as Mrs. Macaboy
 Tom Tully as Mr. Charles E. Macaboy
 Ann Doran as Mrs. Levoy
 Elinor Donahue as Pattie Marie Levoy
 Kathleen Freeman as Mrs. Kahrney
 Doreen McCann as Albertina Kahrney
 Alex Gerry as Hamlet (Smittie's regular)
 Dick Wessel as Smitty - cafe owner
 John Handley as Johnny - Little boy dancer who plays the "grape" (uncredited)
 Gene Kelly and Stanley Donen make uncredited cameo appearances as themselves seated at a table at 21 Restaurant.

Box office
According to MGM records the film earned $634,000 in the US and $340,000 elsewhere resulting in a loss of $362,000.

References

External links
 
 
 
 
 

1952 films
1952 romantic comedy films
American black-and-white films
American romantic comedy films
Films directed by Stanley Donen
Films scored by Lennie Hayton
Films set in Connecticut
Films set in New York City
Metro-Goldwyn-Mayer films
1950s English-language films
1950s American films